This is a list of non-South African footballers who currently play or have played association football in South Africa.

Asia - AFC

Australia

 James Brown - (Cape Town City FC) - 2016
 Kearyn Baccus - Kaizer Chiefs (2019-2022)

India

 Brandon Fernandes – (ASD Cape Town) – Youth
 Myron Mendes – (ASD Cape Town) – Youth

New Zealand

Africa - CAF

Algeria

 Farès Hachi - (Mamelodi Sundowns F.C.) - 2017-

Angola

 Antonio Correia - (Ajax Cape Town F.C.) - 2011
 Armando Pedro

Benin

 Koutche Kabirou - (Witbank Spurs F.C.) - 2016-
 Christophe Aifimi - (Black Leopards F.C.) - 2017-

Botswana
 Lesenya Ramoraka - (Highlands Park F.C.) - 2019
 Mogakolodi Ngele - (Black leopards F.C.) - 2019-
 Phenyo Mongala
 Thabang Sesinyi - (Platinum Stars F.C.) - 2017-
 Mpho Kgaswane - (Baroka F.C.) - 2017-
 Lebogang Ditsele - (Highlands Park F.C.) - 2016-
 Mogogi Gabonamong - 
 Joel Mogorosi -
 Diphetogo "Dipsy" Selolwane -(Santos F.C.) - 2005

Burkina Faso

 Aristide Bancé - (Chippa United F.C.) - 2015-16
 Issouf Paro - (Engen Santos) - 2015-17

Burundi

 Valery Nahayo
 Kevin Ndayisenga - (Jomo Cosmos F.C.) - 2016-
 Frédéric Nsabiyumva - Jomo Cosmos F.C.) - 2014-
 Fiston Abdul Razak - (Mamelodi Sundowns F.C., Bloemfontein Celtic F.C.) - 2015, 2016–17, 2017-

Cameroon

 Jean Njoh
 Halidou Malam - (Kaizer Chiefs F.C.) - 1999
 Eric Bisser - (Ajax Cape Town F.C.) - 2008-09
 Alain Amougou - (Mamelodi Sundowns F.C.) - 1999-02
 Eyong Enoh - (Ajax Cape Town F.C.) - 2006-08
 Luc Zoa
 Didier Mbendje
Amour Patrick Tignyemb - (Bloemfontein Celtic F.C., Chippa United F.C.) - 2008-2019, 2019

Cape Verde

 Jerry Adriano - (Orlando Pirates) - 2008-09

Chad

 Marco Mourmada - (Witbank Aces) - 1995-1997

Djibouti

 Mohamed Liban - (Dynamos Giyani) - 2010-2014

DR Congo
 Tsholola Tshinyama (Ajax Cape Town F.C) 
 Dikulu Bageta  (Ajax Cape Town F.C
 Kanku Mulekelayi  (Ajax Cape Town F.C
 Cyrille Mubiala  (Ajax Cape Town F.C
 Liswa Nduti
 Lelo Mbele
 Marcel Nkueni
 Eshele Botende
 Kabamba Musasa - (Kaizer Chiefs)
 Felix Musasa - (Orlando Pirates)
 Tshamala Kabanga - (Orlando Pirates) - 2003-05
 Michel Babale - (Free State Stars F.C., Kaizer Chiefs F.C., Orlando Pirates F.C., Black Leopards F.C., Wits University F.C., F.C. AK, Maritzburg United F.C., Highlands Park F.C.) - 1997-01, 2001–02, 2002–03, 2003–04, 2004–06, 2006–08, 2009, 2014
 Jean Munganga - (Black Leopards F.C.) - 2012-
 Ibrahim Somé Salombo - (Ajax Cape Town F.C.) - 2005-06
 Emeka Mamale - (Free State Stars F.C., Kaizer Chiefs, Platinum Stars F.C.) - 1998-99, 1999-01, 2006–07
 Bunene Ngaduane - (Free State Stars F.C., Moroka Swallows F.C.) - 1993-94, 1997–99, 2000

Egypt

 Amr Gamal - (Bidvest Wits F.C.) - 2017-

Ethiopia

 Fikru Tefera - (Orlando Pirates, Supersport United, Free State Stars F.C., University of Pretoria F.C., Milano United F.C., Bidvest Wits F.C., Highlands Park F.C.) - 2006-07, 2007–09, 2010–11, 2013, 2013–14, 2014, 2015, 2017

Gabon

 Allen Nono - (Free State Stars F.C.) - 2017-
 Stevy Nzambe - (AmaZulu F.C.) - 2016-
 Guy-Roger Nzeng

Gambia

 Emil Sambou - (Engen Santos)
 Pa Dembo Touray - (Engen Santos) - 2012-15

Ghana

 Samuel Darpoh 
 Fatau Dauda - (Orlando Pirates) - 2013-14
 Kwame Attram - (Tshakhuma Tsha Madzivhandila F.C.) - 2015
 Joseph Masel - (Ajax Cape Town F.C.) - 2008-09
 Louis Agyemang - (Kaizer Chiefs F.C., Dynamos) - 2005-07, 2007–08
 Ofosu Appiah - (Jomo Cosmos F.C.) - 2011-12
 Jonathan Mensah - Free State Stars F.C. - 2008-09
 Mohamed Awal - (Maritzburg United F.C.) - 2012-15

Guinea

 Bangali Keïta - (Free State Stars F.C.) - 2017-
 Aboubacar Fofana - (Ajax Cape Town F.C.) - 2009-10
 Kémoko Camara
 Seydouba Soumah

Guinea-Bissau

 Bacar Baldé - (Vasco da Gama) - 2015-16

Ivory Coast

 Didi Gnepa - (Orlando Pirates)
 Badra Ali Sangaré - (Free State Stars F.C.) - 2017-
 Brice Aka - (Maritzburg United F.C., Jomo Cosmos F.C.) - 2008-14, 2014-
 Aubin Takutchie - (SuperSport United F.C., Hellenic F.C., Bidvest Wits F.C., Fidentia Rangers) - 2003-04, 2004–05, 2005–06
 Serge Djiehoua - (Kaizer Chiefs F.C.) - 2005-08
 Franck Manga Guela - (Mamelodi Sundowns F.C.) - 2003-04
 Siaka Tiéné - (Mamelodi Sundonws F.C.) - 2003-05
 Abraham Gneki Guié - (Jomo Cosmos) - 2006-07
 Mohammed Diallo
 Soumahoro Bangaly

Kenya

 Brian Onyango - (Engen Santos, Maritzburg United F.C.)
 David Gateri - (Salt River Blackpool ASD)

Lesotho

 Katleho Moleko Santos, Amazulu
 Motlalepula Mofolo
 Lehlohonolo Seema - (Bloemfontein Celtic F.C., Orlando Pirates)
 Tefo Maipato - (Orlando Pirates) 
 Lekoane Lekoane - (Kaizer Chiefs F.C.)
 Tsepo Lekhoana - (Maluti FET College)
 Sepiriti Malefane - (Bloemfontein Celtic F.C.) - 2013-14
Lebajoa Mphongoa Bloemfotein Celtic 
Motlatsi Shale Bloemfontein Celtic
Tshwrelo Bereng Moroka Swallows, Chipa Unites, Black Leopards
Tumelo Khutlang Black Leopards 
Paballo Mpakanyane Tembisa Classic
Teele Ntsonyana Wits University 
Tseliso Thite Bloemfontein Celtic 
Luciano Matsoso Black Leopards 
Nkoto Masoabi Real Kings 
Motebang Sera Bloemfontein Celtic 
Motlomelo Mkwanazi Tshakhuma Madzivhadila   
Moses Maliehe Vaal Professionals

Liberia

 Kpah Sherman - (Mpumalanga Black Aces F.C., Engen Santos) - 2015-16, 2016
 Anthony Laffor - (Jomo Cosmos F.C., Supersport United, Mamelodi Sundowns F.C.) - 2005-08, 2008–12, 2012-
 Herron Berrian - (Free State Stars F.C.) - 2012-13
 Dulee Johnson - (AmaZulu F.C.) - 2012

Madagascar

 Arohasina Andrianarimanana - (Kaizer Chiefs F.C., Black Leopards F.C.) 2018-2019, 2019-

Mali

 Abdoulaye Camara
 Sékou Camara
 Cheick Cissé - (Moroka Swallows F.C.) - 2011-2013
 Ousmane Berthé - (Jomo Cosmos F.C.) - 2008-13

Malawi

 Muhammad Sulumba
 Chiukepo Msowoya
 Joseph Kamwendo
 Essau Kanyenda - (Jomo Cosmos F.C., Polokwane City F.C.) - 2001-03, 2012–17
 Micium Mhone - (Jomo Cosmos F.C.) - 2016-17
 Harry Nyirenda - (Black Leopards F.C.) - 2011-
 Chiukepo Msowoya - (Orlando Pirates, Platinum Stars F.C.) - 2010-12, 2012
Hellings "Gabadinho" Mhango -Bloemfotein Celtic, bidvest and Orlando pirates
Gerald "papa" Phiri- Baroka fc

Mauritius

 Jean-Marc Ithier - (Santos Cape Town) - 1999-06
 Jean-Sébastien Bax - (Santos Cape Town) - 2000-08

Mozambique

 Domingues
 Jeitoso
 Hélder Pelembe
 Tomás Inguana
 Dário Monteiro
 Edmilson Gabriel Dove - (Cape Town City FC) - 2017-
 Jossias Macamo - (Kaizer Chiefs F.C., Dynamos Giyani, Moroka Swallows F.C.) - 2001-03, 2003–05, 2005–06
 Edmilson Dove - (Cape Town City F.C.) - 2016-
 Nuro Tualibudane - (Jomo Cosmos F.C., AmaZulu F.C.) - 1998-02, 2002–03
 Vitinho - (Mamelodi Sundowns, Platinum Stars F.C.) - 2002-03
 Tico-Tico - (Jomo Cosmsos F.C., SuperSport United F.C., Orlando Pirates, Maritzburg United F.C., Jomo Cosmos F.C.) - 1997-00, 2000–04, 2004–06, 2006–08, 2008, 2008–10

Namibia

 Deon Hotto
 Floris Diergaardt
 Rudolf Bester
 Henrico Botes
 Heinrich Isaacks
 Quinton Jacobs
 Danzyl Bruwer
 Richard Gariseb
 Rudolf Bester
 Wangu Gome 
 Denzil Hoaseb
 Theophilus Tsowaseb
 Quinton Jacobs - (Black Leopards F.C., Ajax Cape Town F.C.) - 2001-03, 2005–06
 Lazarus Kaimbi - (Jomo Cosmos F.C.) - 2006-12
 Tangeni Shipahu - (AmaZulu F.C.) - 2010-12
 Mahoumed Auseb - (Kaizer Chiefs)
 Robert Nauseb - (Kaizer Chiefs)
 (Vigil Freese) - ([Kaizer Chiefs]), (Maritzburg United)

Niger

 Boubacar Talatou
 Seidou Idrissa - (Chippa United F.C.) - 2012-13

Nigeria

 Onyekachi Okonkwo
 Chibuzor Nwogbo
 Tony Ilodigwe
 Franklin Ogbonna - (Jomo Cosmos F.C.)
 Shaibu Dazumi (Mamelodi Sundowns F.C.)
 Benson Otiti - (Wits University F.C.)
 Teslim Fatusi - (Mamelodi Sundowns F.C.)
 Abdullahi Ishaka - (AmaZulu F.C.) - 2009-10
 Willy Okpara - (Orlando Pirates) - 1989-05
 Tasiu Mohammed - (Ajax Cape Town F.C.) - 2009
 Wasiu Ipaye - (Kaizer Chiefs F.C.) - 1997-98
 Christian Nwaokorie - (Orlando Pirates) - 1997-98
 Ezenwa Otorogu - (Orlando Pirates, Bloemfontein Celtic F.C.) - 2010-11, 2011–12
 Sonny Opara - (Orlando Pirates) - 1997-98
 Ibezito Ogbonna - (Kaizer Chiefs F.C.) - 2008-10
 Ibrahim Omotayo - (Maritzburg United F.C., Durban Stars F.C.) - 2006, 2007
 Raphael Chukwu - (Mamelodi Sundowns F.C.) - 1996-99, 2000–01, 2004
 Solomon Okpako - (Mamelodi Sundonws F.C., Engen Santos)

Republic of Congo

 Harris Tchilimbou - (Free State Stars F.C.) - 2018-
 Christoffer Mafoumbi - (Free State Stars F.C.) - 2016-17
 Old Jupiter Itoua - (AmaZulu F.C.) - 2001-06
 Béranger Itoua - (Orlando Pirates) - 2013
 Fabry Destin Makita-Passy

Rwanda

 Olivier Kwizera - (Free State Stars F.C.) - 2017-

Senegal

 Mame Niang - (Moroka Swallows F.C., SuperSport United F.C., University of Pretoria F.C., SuperSport United F.C., Mamelodi Sundowns F.C., Stellenbosch F.C.) - 2005-07, 2011–12, 2012–13, 2013–14, 2014–15, 2017
 El-Hadji Abdou Samb - (Jomo Cosmos F.C.) - 2011-13, 2016
 Bouna Coundoul - (Platinum Stars F.C.) - 2015-16

Sudan

 Haytham Tambal - (Orlando Pirates) - 2006-07

Swaziland

 Dennis Masina
 Phinda Dlamini 
 Sandile Ginindza - (Royal Eagles F.C.) - 2012-13
 Ronnie Dube - (Kaizer Chiefs F.C.)
 Siza Dlamini 
 Bongani Mdluli
 Sibusiso Dlamini
 John Mdluli
 Tony Tsabedze
 Wonder Nhleko
 Dennis Masina

Tanzania

 Abdi Banda - (Baroka F.C.) 
 Uhuru Mwambungu
 Deogratias Munishi

Togo

 Sadat Ouro-Akoriko

Uganda

 Allan Kateragga - (Cape Town City F.C. (2016)) - 2018-
 Vusimuzi Mngomezulu - (Polokwane City F.C.) - 2018-
 Timothy Batabaire
 Boban Zirintusa
 Dennis Onyango - Mamelodi Sundowns

Zambia

 Hijani Himoonde
 Clive Hachilensa
 Perry Mutapa
 Isaac Chansa
 Aubrey Funga - (Ajax Cape Town F.C.) - 2017
 Rotson Kilambe - (Mamelodi Sundowns, Bloemfontein Celtic F.C., Kaizer Chiefs) - 2003-05, 2005–06, 2006–07
 Davies Mwape - (Orlando Pirates, FC AK, Jomo Cosmos F.C.) - 2005-06, 2006–07, 2007–08
 Sandras Kumwenda - (Dynamos, City Pillars F.C.) - 2002-03, 2003–04
 Christopher Katongo - (Jomo Cosmos F.C., Golden Arrows, Bidvest Wits F.C.) - 2004-07, 2014, 2014–15
 James Chamanga - (Bush Bucks, SuperSport United F.C., Moroka Swallows F.C.) - 2005-06, 2006–07, 2007–08
 Collins Mbesuma - (Kaizer Chiefs F.C., Mamelodi Sundowns F.C., Moroka Swallows F.C., Golden Arrows, Orlando Pirates, Mpumalanga Black Aces F.C., Highlands Park F.C. - 2004-05, 2008–09, 2009–10, 2010–12, 2012–14, 2014–16, 2016–17
 Dennis Lota - (Witbank Aces, Orlando Pirates, Dangerous Darkies, Moroka Swallows F.C., FC AK, AmaZulu F.C., Mpumalanga Black Aces F.C.) - 1996-97, 1998-02, 2003–04, 2004–06, 2006–07, 2007–08, 2008–09
Oliver Bvuma-  ROSEBANK COLLEGE F.C.

Zimbabwe

 Bruce Grobbelaar
 Bobby Chalmers
 Takesure Chinyama
 Zvenyika Makonese
 Musa Mnguni
 Edelbert Dinha
 Erick Chipeta
 Kudakwashe Mahachi
 Tatenda Mkuruva
 Onismor Bhasera
 Khama Billiat
 Tendai Ndoro
 George Chigova 
 Teenage Hadebe
 Ovidy Karuru
 Marshall Munetsi
 Evans Rusike
 Talent Chawapiwa
 Simba Nhivi 
 Qadr Amin - (Orlando Pirates)
 Simba Sithole - (Ajax Cape Town F.C.) - 2014
 Edmore Chirambadare - (Kaizer Chiefs F.C.) - 2016-
 Michelle Katsvairo - (Kaizer Chiefs F.C.) - 2016-
 Thomas Chideu - (Ajax Cape Town F.C.) - 2015-2017
 Blessing Moyo - (Maritzburg United F.C.) - 2016-
 Adam Ndlovu - (Moroka Swallows F.C., Dynamos Giyani, Free State Stars F.C.) - 2002-03, 2003–04, 2004–05
 Prince Dube - (Supersport United) - 2017-
 Patrick Musaka - (Black Leopards F.C.) - 2016-
 Benjani Mwaruwari - (Jomo Cosmos F.C., Chippa United F.C., Bidvest Wits F.C.) - 1999-02, 2012–13, 2013–14
 Luke Jukulile - (Kaizer Chiefs F.C., Dynamos) - 2001-02, 2002–04
 Rodreck Mutuma - (Bloemfontein Celtic F.C.) - 2013-14
 Shingayi Kaondera - (SuperSport United F.C.) - 2006-07
 Peter Ndlovu - (Mamelodi Sundowns F.C., Thanda Royal Zulu F.C.) - 2004-08, 2008–09
 Nyasha Mushekwi - (Mamelodi Sundowns F.C.) - 2010-15
 Tauya Mrewa - (Hellenic F.C., SuperSport United F.C., Ajax Cape Town F.C., AmaZulu F.C., Bush Bucks) - 1999, 1999-01, 2001–02, 2002, 2002–05
 Ian Gorowa - (Cape Town Spurs - 1997-99
 Cuthbert Malajila - (Maritzburg United F.C., Mamelodi Sundowns F.C., Bidvest Wits F.C., Mamelodi Sundowns F.C.) - 2012-13, 2013–16, 2016–17, 2017-
 Kingston Nkhatha - (Free State Stars F.C., Carara Kicks F.C., Free State Stars F.C., Black Leopards F.C., Kaizer Chiefs F.C., SuperSport United F.C.) - 2007-08, 2008–09, 2009–11, 2011–12, 2012–15, 2015-
 George Nechironga - (Bloemfontein Celtic F.C., Free State Stars F.C., African Wanderers F.C.) - 1993-94, 1996–99, 1999-00, 2000-01
 Knox Mutizwa
 Wilfred Mugeyi - (Bush Bucks F.C., Ajax Cape Town F.C., Free State Stars F.C.) - 1993-94, 1995-00, 2000–03, 2003–06, 2006–07
 Knowledge Musona - (Kaizer Chiefs F.C.) -  2009-11, 2013–14
 Gilbert Mushangazhike - (Manning Rangers, Orlando Pirates, Mpumalanga Black Aces F.C., Orlando Pirates) - 1997-03, 2007–09, 2009–10, 2010
 Lincoln Zvasiya - (Kaizer Chiefs F.C.) - 2011-14

Europe - UEFA

Austria

 Roland Putsche - (Cape Town City F.C. (2016)) - 2016-
 Walter Rautmann - (Powerlines FC, Berea Park F.C., Highlands Park F.C.)
 Markus Böcskör - (Kaizer Chiefs F.C.) - 2007-08
 Kurt Scherr - (Powerlines FC)
 Peter Rath - (Powerlines FC)

Belgium

 Maxime Cosse - (Free State Stars F.C.) - 2018-
 Andréa Fileccia - (Free State Stars F.C.) - 2014-16, 2016-

Bosnia and Herzegovina

 Boris Savić - (Moroka Swallows F.C.) - 2014-15

Denmark

 Kai Johansen

England

 Johnny Haynes
 Peter Withe
 Gary France
 Sam Mason-Smith - (Stellenbosch F.C.) - 2018-
 Chris Chilton - (Highlands Park F.C.) - 1974-78
 Carl Finnigan - (Chippa United F.C.) - 2013-14
 Jeff Astle - (Hellenic F.C.) - 1974
 James Keene
 Ian Filby
 Johnny Byrne 
 Milija Aleksic

France

 Derek Decamps - (Ajax Cape Town F.C.) - 2009-11
 Joris Delle- (Orlando Pirates) 2019-20

Finland

 Anssi Jaakkola - (Ajax Cape Town F.C.) - 2013-16

Germany

 Thomas Cichon - (Moroka Swallows F.C.) - 2009-10
 Wolfgang Gayer - (Durban City F.C.) - 1972, (Hellenic F.C.) - 1973
 Volkmar Groß - (Hellenic F.C.) - 1972-74

Georgia

 Giorgi Nergadze - (Moroka Swallows F.C., Bidvest Wits F.C.) - 2010-14, 2014–15

Gibraltar

 Tony Macedo

Iceland

 Árni Gautur Arason - (Thanda Royal Zulu) - 2008
 Jóhannes Eðvaldsson - (Cape Town City F.C.) - 1972

Latvia

 Pāvels Šteinbors - (Golden Arrows F.C.) - 2012-13

Montenegro

 Slavko Damjanović - (Bidvest Wits F.C.) - 2017-

Netherlands

 Rolf de Boer - (Ajax Cape Town F.C.) - 1999
 Marciano Vink - (Ajax Cape Town F.C.) - 2001-02
 Geert Brusselers _ (Ajax Cape Town F.C.) - 2001-02
 Jeremy Overbeek-Bloem - (Ajax Cape Town F.C.) - 2001-03
 Koen van de Laak
 Sander Westerveld
 Alje Schut - (Mamelodi Sundowns) - 2012-15

Northern Ireland

 George Best
 Eric Welsh

Norway

 Arne Bjørnstad

Portugal

 Luis Boa Morte - (Orlando Pirates) - 2012

Republic of Ireland

 Ryan Hartslief
 Eoin Hand

Romania

 Tiberiu Lung - (Mpumalanga Black Aces F.C.) - 2010
 Vasile Gergely - (Durban City F.C.) - 1972-73

Russia

 Grigori Grishin - (University of Pretoria F.C.) - 2016-

Scotland

 Willie McIntosh
 Ben Anderson
 Joe Frickleton - (Highlands Park F.C.) - 1964-74
 Danny Cameron - (Hellenic F.C.)
 Jim Forrest - (Cape Town City F.C.) - 1973
 Danny Ferguson - (Durban United F.C.) - 1967-68
 Joe Fascione - (Durban City F.C.) - 1969-71
 Eddie Connachan - (East London United F.C.) - 1969-72
 Alfie Conn Sr. - (Johannesburg Ramblers) - 1960
 Ian Gibson
 Matt Gray
 Alf Boyd

Serbia

 Obren Čučković - (Moroka Swallows F.C.) - 2014-15
 Igor Bondžulić - (Moroka Swallows F.C.) - 2013-14
 Dejan Bogunović - (Maritzburg United F.C.) - 2006-07
 Sead Bajramović - (Free State Stars F.C.) - 2007-08
 Samir Nurkovic - (Kaizer Chiefs F.C) - 2019-

Spain

 Alfonso Tiravit - (Powerlines FC)

Wales

Bryan Orritt
Michael Brown - (Highlands Park F.C.)

North America - CONCACAF

United States

 Dino Ramic - (Highlands Park F.C.) - 2015-16
 Morgan Cathey - (Ikapa Sporting F.C.)

Oceania - OFC

New Zealand

South America - CONMEBOL

Argentina

 Nick Gindre - (AmaZulu F.C., Mpumalanga Black Aces F.C.) - 2009-10, 2011–12
 Óscar Fabbiani - (Cape Town Spurs) - 1984-85
 Sergio Egea - (Lusitano FC)
Vincent Principiano-(Mamelodi Sundowns F.C.) 2006 - 07
 Jorge Sanabria

Brazil

 Walter da Silva
 Jairzinho - (Kaizer Chiefs F.C.) - 1975
 Ricardo Nascimento - (Mamelodi Sundowns FC)
 Marcos Paulo Aguiar de Jesus - (Wits University F.C.) - 2006-08
 Fábio Bittencourt da Costa - (Mamelodi Sundowns FC) - 2006-07
 Wanderson Costa Viana - (Ajax Cape Town F.C.) - 2012-13
 Igor Alves - (Moroka Swallows F.C.) - 2008-11
 Getúlio Vargas - (Orlando Pirates) - 2011-12
 Pepe - (Wits University F.C.) - 2006-08
 William Moreira - (Moroka Swallows F.C.) - 1997-98
 Rodrigo Gomes - (Ajax Cape Town F.C.) - 2000-01
 Elton Morelato - (Moroka Swallows F.C.) - 2008-09
 Thiago Rodrigo dos Santos - (Moroka Swallows F.C.)
 Pedrão - (Highlands Park F.C.)
 Marcelo - (Orlando Pirates ) - 2018-19

Chile

 Jorge Acuña - (Mamelodi Sundowns F.C.) - 2007-09

Colombia

 Robinson Rentería - (Maritzburg United F.C.) - 2008-09
 Leonardo Castro - (Mamelodi Sundowns F.C., Kaizer Chiefs FC) 2015-17, 2018-current

Peru

 Augusto Palacios - (Witbank Spurs F.C., AmaZulu F.C.) - 1984-89, 1990

Venezuela

 Rafael Dudamel – Mamelodi Sundowns (2005–06)
 José Torrealba – Mamelodi Sundowns (2005–07) & Kaizer Chiefs (2008–11) 
 Gustavo Páez – Kaizer Chiefs (2017–2019)
 José Meza – Mamelodi Sundowns (2018–20) & Maritzburg United (2020–22)
 Juan Carlos Ortiz – Stellenbosch (2022–)
 Darwin González – Cape Town City (2022–)

Uruguay

 Bryan Aldave - (Mamelodi Sundowns F.C.) - 2008-09
Leandro Gastón Sirino Rodríguez - (Mamelodi Sundowns F.C) - 2019-current 
 (Mamelodi Sundowns F.C.) - 2008-09

References

South Africa
foreign
Association football player non-biographical articles